Hello, I'm Dolly is the debut studio album by American singer-songwriter Dolly Parton. It was released on September 18, 1967, by Monument Records. The album was produced by Fred Foster. It peaked at number 11 on the Billboard Top Country Albums chart. The album spawned two top 40 hits, "Dumb Blonde" and "Something Fishy", which peaked at numbers 24 and 17, respectively.

Background
Parton began performing as a child, singing on local radio and television programs in the East Tennessee area. By ten, she was appearing on The Cas Walker Show on both WIVK Radio and WBIR-TV in Knoxville, Tennessee. Parton made her first professional recording at age 13 when she recorded "Puppy Love" for Goldband Records. Released in April 1959, the single did not chart. After making musical connections while performing on The Cas Walker Show, Parton and her uncle, Bill Owens, managed to get a guest spot on the Grand Ole Opry on July 25, 1959. Jimmy C. Newman agreed to give up one of his regular Saturday night spots to allow Parton to perform. Parton was introduced by Johnny Cash before she performed a cover of George Jones' "You Gotta Be My Baby" and received three encores. Parton and Owens were signed to Tree Publishing on June 26, 1962, and released one single on Circle B Records prior to Parton releasing "It's Sure Gonna Hurt" in August on Mercury Records. When the single failed to chart Parton and was dropped by the label and Tree Publishing. Parton recorded six songs in 1963 for the Somerset Records budget compilation album Hits Made Famous by Country Queens. Three selections were songs made famous by Kitty Wells and the three others were traditional ballads.

After graduating high school in May 1964, Parton moved to Nashville the next day. Her initial success came as a songwriter, when Fred Foster, owner of Combine Music and Monument Records, signed Parton to a publishing and recording deal. During this early period at Monument, Parton wrote songs that were recorded by a variety of artists, including Bill Phillips, Skeeter Davis, Hank Williams Jr., and even Kitty Wells. Foster originally felt that Parton's voice was not suited for country and tried to market her as a bubblegum pop singer with the release of her first five singles for the label: "What Do You Think About Lovin'" (1964), "Happy, Happy Birthday Baby" (1965), "Busy Signal" (1966), "Don't Drop Out" (1966), and "The Little Things" (1966). The most successful of these releases was "Happy, Happy Birthday Baby", which managed to peak at number 108 on the Billboard Bubbling Under the Hot 100 chart.

Following the success of Bill Phillips' recording of Parton's composition "Put It Off Until Tomorrow" (featuring uncredited harmony by Parton) in 1966, Foster was finally persuaded to allow Parton to record country material.

Release and promotion
The album's release was likely pushed back several times. In Parton's 1994 autobiography, My Life and Other Unfinished Business, the release date is given as February 1967, but this date is contradicted by an interview Parton gave in June 1967, where she states that the album "should be out by the end of this month." The album's release was announced for September 1967 by  Cashbox, and Record World, following Parton's debut as a regular on The Porter Wagoner Show on September 5. It was finally released September 18, 1967, on LP.

Singles
The album's first single, "The Little Things", was the final of Parton's pop leaning singles for Monument. It was released in June 1966 and failed to chart.

"Dumb Blonde" was released as a single in November 1966 and debuted at number 64 on the Billboard Hot Country Songs chart dated January 21, 1967. It peaked at number 24 on the chart dated March 18, its ninth week on the chart. It charted for a total of 14 weeks.

The album's third single, "Something Fishy", was released in May and debuted at number 61 on the Billboard Hot Country Songs chart dated June 10. It peaked at number 17 on the chart dated August 5, its ninth week on the chart, becoming Parton's first top 20 hit. It charted for 12 weeks.

Content
Three of the album's 12 tracks are solo Parton compositions and seven of them were co-written with her uncle, Bill Owens. The two remaining tracks, "Dumb Blonde" and "I've Lived My Life", were written by Curly Putman and Lola Jean Dillon, respectively.

The album contains Parton's version of three songs she had written that had already been hits for other artists. "Put It Off Until Tomorrow" had been recorded by Bill Phillips (with uncredited harmony vocals by Parton) and released as a single in January 1966. It peaked at number six on the Billboard Hot Country Songs chart. Skeeter Davis had recorded "Fuel to the Flame" and released it as a single in January 1967 and it peaked at number 11 on the Billboard Hot Country Songs chart. Hank Williams Jr. recorded "I'm in No Condition" and released it as a single in April 1967. It was the least successful of these three songs, peaking at number 60 on the Billboard Hot Country Songs chart.

Critical reception

Billboard published a review of the album in the issue dated October 28, 1967, saying, "Dolly Parton has a little girl voice but it's Lolita in style on the honky-tonking, carousing "Dumb Blonde". She also does extremely well on "I Wasted My Tears", "I Don't Want to Throw Rice", Something Fishy" and "Fuel to the Flame"."

Cashbox published a review which said, "Dolly Parton could have a big winner in her possession with this striking album. Singing at the top of her form throughout the entire set, the lark offers "Dumb Blonde", "Put It Off Until Tomorrow", "Fuel to the Flame", "The Giving and the Taking", and eight others. Give this one a careful listen. It should pull in a healthy amount of chart action."

Eugene Chadbourne of AllMusic gave the album 4.5 out of 5 stars, saying that "at least half the songs are among her classics, while the rest of the material is hardly weak." He said that Parton's personality is in "full force" on the album. He described "Dumb Blonde" and "Something Fishy" as showing the "wisecracking, smart-cookie side of Parton" and "The Company You Keep" and "I've Lived My Life" as "moralizing while providing the listener with plenty of enjoyment."

Commercial performance
The album debuted at number 43 on the Billboard Top Country Albums chart dated November 11, 1967. It peaked at number 11 on January 13, 1968, its tenth week on the chart. The album charted for a total of 14 weeks.

Reissues
The album was reissued by Monument in 1972 as a two LP set with 1970's As Long as I Love under the title The World of Dolly Parton. It was reissued on CD in 1988 as The World of Dolly Parton, Volume One. The album was released as a digital download on December 4, 2015.

Track listing

Personnel
Adapted from the album liner notes.
Fred Foster – producer, liner notes, photography
Ken Kim – art direction
Dolly Parton – lead vocals
Tommy Strong – technical engineer
Mort Thomasson – recording engineer

Charts

Release history

References

External links

1967 debut albums
Dolly Parton albums
Albums produced by Fred Foster
Monument Records albums